Colonel Godfrey Bosvile II (1596–1658) (or Bosville) was an English politician who sat in the House of Commons  from 1640 to 1653. He fought on the Parliamentarian side in the English Civil War.

Bosvile was the son of Captain Ralph Bosvile of a knightly family of Gunthwaite, Yorkshire and his wife Margaret Copley. He was baptised on 12 April 1596 at Sprotbrough, Yorkshire. His father died in Ireland in 1601 and his mother remarried Fulke Greville (1575-1632); his younger half-brother Robert Greville, 2nd Baron Brooke became a leading Puritan activist.

In April 1640, Bosvile was elected Member of Parliament for Warwick in the Short Parliament. He was re-elected MP for Warwick in December 1640 for the Long Parliament and sat through to the Rump Parliament. 
 
Bosvile took the protestation, and was appointed commissioner for Yorkshire, Warwick and Coventry. He obtained a commission in the Parliamentary army and he rose to the rank of colonel. In 1643, he marched from Coventry with eight hundred horse, and took the garrisoned house of Sir Thomas Holt. In 1644 he assisted Colonel Purefoy of Warwickshire, at the siege of Banbury. His name was put down as one of the commissioners of the high court of justice to try the king, but he declined taking any part in the trial.

Bosvile died at the age of 62 in Gunthwaite, Yorkshire.

Bosvile married Margery Greville daughter of Sir Edward Greville in 1616.

See also
William Bosville (1745–1813), his descendant.

Further reading
Bosville Macdonald, Alice (Lady Macdonald of the Isles), The Fortunes of a Family (Bosville of New Hall, Gunthwaite and Thorpe) Through Nine Centuries, Edinburgh, 1927

References

Sources
  

 

1596 births
1658 deaths
Roundheads
English MPs 1640 (April)
English MPs 1640–1648
English MPs 1648–1653
Parliamentarian military personnel of the English Civil War